The House of Schallenberg is the name of an old Austro-Hungarian noble family.

History 
The family hails from Sankt Ulrich im Mühlkreis, where it is known since 1190. Heinricus de Schalinberc is mentioned in 1260, adopting the name after the Schallenberg Castle. In 1636 the Schallenbergs were raised to baronial rank and in 1666 they were raised to comital rank in the Habsburg Hereditary Lands. The family received the Hungarian Indigenat and were recognized as nobles of the Kingdom of Hungary by the Diet of Hungary in 1688. From 1720 to 1803  was owned by the family.

Notable members 
 Christoph von Schallenberg (1561–1597), naval commander and humanist poet
 Leopold Christoph, Count of Schallenberg (1712–1800), Governor of Lower Austria
 Herbert, Count of Schallenberg (1901–1974), diplomat and industrialist
 Wolfgang Schallenberg (1930–2023), diplomat
 Alexander Schallenberg (b. 1969), Chancellor of Austria, foreign minister of Austria

References

External links 

 
Austrian noble families
Hungarian noble families